The Kamp is a  river in northern Austria, left tributary of the Danube.

The source of the Kamp is on the border of Lower Austria and Upper Austria, near the town Liebenau, in the Mühlviertel. It flows generally east through Rappottenstein (where it receives its tributary ), Zwettl, Krumau am Kamp, Gars am Kamp and Langenlois. Most of the southern part of the valley belongs to the Kamptal vine region. Before the construction of the hydropower plant in the Danube at Altenwörth in the 1970s, the Kamp flowed into the Danube near Grafenwörth, east of Krems an der Donau. Its discharge point was moved to Altenwörth, and the waters of the river Krems, that used to be a direct tributary of the Danube, were redirected to the Kamp.

References

External links

Rivers of Lower Austria
Rivers of Austria
Geography of Lower Austria